Middle Class Madhavan is a 2001 Indian Tamil-language romantic comedy film written and directed by T. P. Gajendran. The film stars Prabhu and Abhirami, while Vadivelu, Vivek, Manivannan and others in supporting roles. The film explores the travails of newlyweds who are forced to live in a joint family. The film was remade in Telugu as Mee Intikoste Yem Istaru Ma Intikoste Yem Testaru. The music was composed by Dhina, and the film released on 18 May 2001.

Plot
The story is set in the middle-class home of Madhavan (Prabhu), a budding lawyer who works for Visu. His retired and irresponsible father (Delhi Ganesh) is more interested in playing cards than looking for grooms for his two unmarried daughters. Circumstances force Madhavan to marry Abhirami (Abhirami), even before his sisters are wed, a situation quite unthinkable in middle-class homes and the couple unable to have their first night and desperate for it. Meanwhile, Madhavan's sisters find their match in an auto driver named Kuzhandaivelu (Vadivelu) and an unemployed man named Manimaran (Vivek), who claims to have a royal background. Madhavan then conducts the weddings of both his sisters, but in the struggle to keep the rest of his family happy, he and Abirami are unable to enjoy even the basic pleasures of married life. How they unite with each other, have they finally celebrated their first night? and convince their family about it (sometimes with comical results) forms the rest of the story.

Cast

Prabhu as Madhavan
Abhirami as Abhirami
Vadivelu as Kuzhandaivelu
Vivek as Manimaran
Manivannan as House Owner 
Visu as Madhavan's boss
Delhi Ganesh as Madhavan's father
Revathi Sankaran as Madhavan's mother
Tharani as Leela Kuzhandaivelu (Madhavan's sister)
Radhika Chaudhari as Neela Manimaran (Madhavan's sister)
Ennatha Kannaiya as Kuzhandhaivelu's father
Shanmugasundari as Kuzhandhaivelu's mother
Kaka Radhakrishnan as Manimaran's grandfather
Jyothi Lakshmi as Manimaran's grandmother
Shyam Ganesh
Seeman 
T. P. Gajendran as Wayfarer (special appearance)

Soundtrack
The soundtrack was composed by Dhina with lyrics written by Vaali.

"En Success Theriyadha" — Harini
"Hamma Hamma" — Srinivas, Harini
"Ammamma Thaankaadhu" — Hariharan, Sujatha Mohan
"Pakkam Nikkum Nila" — Mano, Anuradha Sriram, Pushpavanam Kuppusamy
"Maappillai Otta" — Malaysia Vasudevan, Revathi Sankaran, Mano, Swarnalatha

Reception
The movie received mixed to positive reviews from critics.

Balaji Balasubramaniam of thiraipadam.com gave a mixed review and wrote, "Prabhu looks old but the role is no stretch for him. Abirami, last seen in Vaanavil, plays the homely role well. Visu shows up in another of his trademark, advise-giving roles while director T.P.Gajendran himself makes an appearance at several spots in various roles. Songs by Dhina are not particularly memorable. Comedy occupies a major portion of this movie too with Vadivelu and Vivek. Vadivelu surprises us with his initial softness but reverts to his usual loud ways soon. Vivek has some funny lines with his royal heritage."

Savitha Padmanabhan of The Hindu gave a mixed review and wrote, "The plot gets too predictable after a point, but that is true of most films today. Prabhu's cherubic smile and effortless acting are plus points. Abhirami looks pretty as the homely wife. Delhi Ganesh flits in and out while Visu is at his didactic best. Vadivelu and Vivek do what they are adept at... raising a few laughs. But after a point they get quite tiresome, and even interfere with the main story. Music by Dhina is below average. In fact, the songs stick out like a sore thumb. The director has tried to raise a pertinent issue, but it could have been handled with finesse."

Tamilmovienow.com gave a positive review and wrote, "Prabhu is a favorite actor for director TP Gajendran and he handles such simple roles with ease. Abhirami is calm, subtle yet delivers what the character demands. The buried emotions of an obedient wife have been skillfully displayed by the actor. TP Gajendran seldom directs a movie without comedy and in Middle Class Madhavan, it reaches phenomenal heights with the two veterans Vadivelu and Vivek sharing screen space. The duo is equally competent when it comes to making you laugh uncontrollably. Despite being high on emotions and sentimental sequences, Middle Class Madhavan is enjoyable for its serene comedy and its authentic backdrop of a household."

References

2001 films
Tamil films remade in other languages
2000s Tamil-language films
Indian comedy-drama films
Films directed by T. P. Gajendran
2001 comedy-drama films